Charlesworth is a village and civil parish near Glossop, Derbyshire, England. The population of the civil parish at the 2011 Census was 2,449. The parish church of St John the Baptist was built in 1848–49. The Congregational Chapel was rebuilt from an earlier chapel in 1797. The Baptist Chapel was built in 1835. Broadbottom Bridge, one end of which is in Cheshire, was built in 1683. Charlesworth holds an annual carnival on the second Saturday in July on its recreation ground on Marple Road, which includes fell races and other events.

The village is at the foot of the "Monks' Road", which was used by the monks of Basingwerk Abbey in North Wales. At the top of the road is the Abbot's Chair, the base of a monastic cross also known as the Charlesworth Cross.

Sport
 Charlesworth Cricket Club
 Charlesworth Football Club

See also
Listed buildings in Charlesworth, Derbyshire

References

External links
 Charlesworth Carnival

Villages in Derbyshire
Towns and villages of the Peak District
High Peak, Derbyshire